William McPherson (September 22, 1897 – July 1976) was a Scottish-American soccer wing half. He began his career in Scotland before moving to the American Soccer League. He also spent time in the St. Louis Soccer League, winning a total of five league titles and seven National Challenge Cups during his career.

His record of 370 matches in the U.S. top-flight league stood until being broken by Steve Ralston in 2007.

Playing career

Scotland
Born in Greenock, McPherson signed with Morton of the Scottish Football League in 1919. In 1922, he began the season with Beith F.C. before leaving Scotland for the United States.

American Soccer League
When he arrived, he signed with the Fall River Marksmen of the American Soccer League seeing time in only four games at the end of the 1922-1923 season. He spent most of ten seasons with the Marksmen, winning six league titles and three National Challenge Cups (1924, 1927, 1930). In 1931, the Marksmen merged with the New York Soccer Club to form the New York Yankees. He remained with the renamed team for the spring 1931 season.  That summer, McPherson won his fourth Challenge Cup with the Yankees. In the summer of 1931, the Yankees merged with the Fall River F.C. to form the New Bedford Whalers. Once again McPherson remained with the renamed club, winning the 1932 National Challenge Cup over Stix, Baer and Fuller F.C. of the St. Louis Soccer League (SLSL).

St. Louis Soccer League
By this time the ASL was on its last legs and Alex McNab left the team to sign with Stix, Baer and Fuller. When he arrived in St. Louis, he induced several of his ex-teammates, including McPherson, to join him. They did so and immediately took SBF to two league and two National Cup championships.

American Soccer League II
In 1934, McPherson moved back east to sign with the Pawtucket Rangers who were now competing in the second American Soccer League, the first having collapsed in 1933. In 1935, McPherson went to yet another National Cup final, but this time his team failed to take home the title. The Rangers were defeated in three games (7-6 aggregate) by the St. Louis Central Breweries F.C. who featured several of his former teammates from Stix, Baer and Fuller F.C.

External links
 National Soccer Hall of Fame eligibility

References

1897 births
Scottish footballers
Beith F.C. players
Greenock Morton F.C. players
Scottish Football League players
American soccer players
American Soccer League (1921–1933) players
Fall River Marksmen players
New York Yankees (soccer) players
New Bedford Whalers players
St. Louis Soccer League players
Stix, Baer and Fuller F.C. players
American Soccer League (1933–1983) players
Pawtucket Rangers players
Footballers from Greenock
Scottish emigrants to the United States
1976 deaths
Association football wing halves